"I Hate the French" is a satirical comedy song performed live by Howard Goodall during Rowan Atkinson's 1980 tour of the United Kingdom. A live recording was made at the Grand Opera House in Belfast, Northern Ireland, on 19 or 20 September 1980 and released on Rowan Atkinson's live comedy album, Live in Belfast; it was also released as a single. The music was composed by Goodall and the lyrics were written by comedy writer Richard Curtis.

The lyrics are a comical criticism of the French and are a deliberately hypocritical complaint about their treatment towards the English. The song contains many French stereotypes, references to famous French people and references to things often associated with France, e.g. berets, French bread, French wine and cheese. The lyrics also use irony (e.g. claiming the French stole the word "cul-de-sac" from the English language) and a double entendre ("I'll be buggered if I go to gay Paris").

References

Sources

1980 songs
British songs
Comedy songs
Cultural depictions of French people
Francophobia in Europe
Live singles
Rowan Atkinson
Songs about France
Songs written by Howard Goodall
Works by Richard Curtis